Any Minute Now is an album by Trinidadian Soca artist Machel Montano and his band Xtatik released in 1999.

The album features guest appearances from Beenie Man on "Outa Space", Burning Flames on "Showdown (Band Meet Band)", and Red Rat on "Rubber Waist".

A promotional video for "Outa Space" was made featuring Montano and Beenie Man as 'Men in Black' in search of two female aliens.

Track listing
"Close Encounter (Interlude)"
"Outa Space (UFOs)" - (featuring Beenie Man)
"Big Phat Fish"
"We Sound (Ba Dang)"
"Soca"
"With Or Without You" - (featuring Walker)
"Mocking Meh"
"February"
"Rubber Waist" - (featuring Red Rat)
"Powder Puff"
"Size"
"Lo Riders"
"Showdown (Band Meet Band)" - (featuring Burning Flames)
"Quicksand"
"Any Minute Now"

References

Machel Montano albums
1999 albums